Garbiñe Muguruza and Carla Suárez Navarro were the defending champions, but they chose not to participate this year.

Sania Mirza and Barbora Strýcová won the title, defeating Liang Chen and Yang Zhaoxuan in the final, 6–1, 6–1.

Seeds

Draw

References 
 Draw

Toray Pan Pacific Open - Doubles
2016 Doubles
2016 Toray Pan Pacific Open